The 1985 Pot Black was the seventeenth edition of the professional invitational snooker tournament, which took place in December 1984 but was broadcast in 1985. The tournament was held at Pebble Mill Studios in Birmingham, and featured sixteen professional players in a knock-out system. All matches until the semi-final were one-frame shoot-outs, the semi-final was aggregate score of two frames and the final being contested over the best of three frames.

Broadcasts were on BBC2 and started at 21:00 on Tuesday 8 January 1985  David Icke took over from Alan Weeks as presenter with Ted Lowe remaining as commentator and John Williams as referee.

Debuts include John Parrott and Neal Foulds who previously played in Junior Pot Black and Bill Werbeniuk. Doug Mountjoy won the event, his thirteenth professional title, beating Jimmy White 2–0 in the final. This was also Mountjoy's second Pot Black title; previously, he had won the 1978 edition.

Main draw

Final

References

Pot Black
1985 in snooker
1985 in English sport